In organic chemistry, aminobenzal is a functional group which is composed of a cyclic ketal of a diol with 4-dimethylaminobenzylidene. It is seen in triamcinolone aminobenzal benzamidoisobutyrate.

See also
 Acetonide
 Acetophenide
 Acroleinide
 Cyclopentanonide
 Pentanonide

References